is a 2011 Japanese drama film directed by Hiroshi Kurosaki.

Cast
 Kyōka Suzuki
 Kyoko Fukada
 Hiroki Hasegawa

See also
 Second Virgin

References

External links
  . Archived from the original on 8 October 2011
 . Archived from the original on 6 April 2012

2011 drama films
2011 films
Japanese drama films
Films directed by Hiroshi Kurosaki
2010s Japanese films